This is a list of all tornadoes that were confirmed throughout Europe by the European Severe Storms Laboratory and local meteorological agencies during 2012. Unlike the United States, the original Fujita Scale and the TORRO scale are used to rank tornadoes across the continent.

European yearly total

January

January 3 event

January 6 event

January 7 event

January 8 event

January 20 event

January 27 event

January 31 event

February

February 2 event

February 4 event

February 15 event

February 27 event

February 28 event

March

March 10 event

March 12 event

March 14 event

March 26 event

April

April 8 event

April 9 event

April 10 event

April 11 event

April 15 event

April 17 event

April 18 event

April 20 event

April 22 event

April 24 event

April 25 event

April 29 event

May

May 2 event

May 3 event

May 6 event

May 9 event

May 10 event

May 15 event

May 16 event

May 17 event

May 19 event

May 21 event

May 24 event

May 26 event

May 27 event

May 31 event

June

June 1 event

June 3 event

June 4 event

June 5 event

June 6 event

June 7 event

June 8 event

June 9 event

June 10 event

June 11 event

June 12 event

June 15 event

June 17 event

June 21 event

June 24 event

June 28 event

June 29 event

July

July 7 event

July 8 event

July 9 event

July 10 event

July 11 event

July 12 event

July 13 event

July 14 event

July 15 event

July 16 event

July 17 event

July 19 event

July 20 event

July 25 event

July 30 event

July 31 event

August

August 2 event

August 4 event

August 6 event

August 7 event

August 10 event

August 17 event

August 21 event

August 22 event

August 25 event

August 26 event

August 30 event

August 31 event

September

September 1 event

September 2 event

September 3 event

September 10 event

September 13 event

September 24 event

September 25 event

September 27 event

September 28 event

October

October 2 event

October 4 event

October 8 event

October 9 event

October 10 event

October 11 event

October 12 event

October 13 event

October 14 event

October 15 event

October 21 event

October 25 event

October 26 event

October 27 event

October 29 event

November

November 1 event

November 4 event

November 8 event

November 16 event

November 17 event

November 27 event

November 28 event

November 29 event

December

December 3 event

December 5 event

December 9 event

December 10 event

December 16 event

December 17 event

December 29 event

See also 
 Tornadoes of 2012

References

Tornadoes of 2012
 2012
Tornado-related lists
Tornadoes
2012-related lists